The Intellects (Odia: ଦ ଇଣ୍ଟେଲେକ୍ଟସ) is a non-government nonprofit organisation of Non-resident Odias (NRO) intellects based in New Delhi. It was registered in October 2012 with New Delhi Govt.

References 

2012 establishments in Delhi
Odia language